The Temo (Temu in Sardinian) is a river in western Sardinia, Italy.

Along its course were built two dams: 
 the  Diga di Monte Crispu  with the purpose of protecting the town of Bosa against flooding
  the Diga dell'Alto Temo  that forms a reservoir of 4.99 km2 designed for water supply

Rivers of Italy
Rivers of Sardinia
Rivers of the Province of Oristano
Rivers of the Province of Sassari
European drainage basins of the Mediterranean Sea